Koblenz University of Applied Sciences (German: Hochschule Koblenz, formerly known as Fachhochschule Koblenz or FH Koblenz) is a public university in Rhineland-Palatinate. Although the present university was established in 1996, it has a rich tradition in higher education. The roots of today's Faculty of Materials Engineering, Glass and Ceramics in Hoehr‑Grenzhausen, come down to the 19th century.

Overview 
The six faculties of University of Applied Sciences Koblenz currently offer more than 40 degree courses, including more than 30 bachelor degree courses and more than 10 master's degree courses. These figures are no more than a snapshot, since the offers are constantly adjusted to current demand trends. Some of the degree courses are offered as correspondence courses or integrated degree programs. As a result of the Bologna process, Hochschule Koblenz has completed the conversion to bachelor's and master's degree courses.

Faculty and Sites 
The university spans three campuses in three different cities, Koblenz, Remagen and Höhr-Grenzhausen.

The opening of the new campus complex in 2009 marked a major milestone in the history of RheinMoselCampus. On a building site of more than 4 acres, a total of 619 rooms (including 28 seminar rooms, 237 offices and a variety of lecture halls and laboratories with high-tech equipment and up-to-date facilities) were built. Today, this campus complex accommodates the Faculties of Architecture, Business Administration, Engineering and Social Science as well as the university administration. A day nursery run by Studierendenwerk Koblenz is also available on site.

RheinMoselCampus Koblenz-Karthause 
The RheinMoselCampus, located in the residential area of Koblenz-Karthause, accommodates the following university faculties:

Faculty of Engineering (with the Departments of Mechanical Engineering, Electrical Engineering and Information Technology).
Faculty of Business Administration
Faculty of Architecture (with the Departments of Architecture and Civil Engineering)
Faculty of Social Science

RheinAhrCampus Remagen 
RheinAhrCampus Remagen, the northernmost location of Koblenz University of Applied Sciences, was established as part of the Bonn/Berlin compensation agreement (Berlin-Bonn Act) in 1998. After a period of rapid growth, the current student population is about 2700 students (March 2012). The campus site is located directly on the Rhine, near the Ahr. The campus is equipped with a dormitory that can accommodate 102 students. A daycare center for children of students and employees is also available on site.
Access to a beach volleyball court is also available on campus. In addition, an indoor tennis facility, a football court and a swimming pool are located within easy walking distance. The degree courses offered at RheinAhrCampus Remagen are organized by two faculties:
Faculty of Business and Social Management
Faculty of Mathematics and Technology

WesterwaldCampus Höhr-Grenzhausen 
The tradition of Ceramic Education in Höhr-Grenzhausen goes back to the 19th century. Due to the mining of high quality plastic clays in the Westerwald region, crafts pottery and the industrial processing of clay are strongly rooted in the region. Thus, the existing cooperation links with Research institutes like “Deutsches Institut für Feuerfest und Keramik GmbH” provide the students with additional opportunities for training and employment. Research and teaching at the WesterwaldCampus of Hochschule Koblenz focus on modern  Materials Science and Engineering  with a focus on glass and ceramics as well as the fine arts. Research and teaching are offered in one department of the Faculty of Engineering and one institute:
Department of Materials Engineering, Glass and Ceramics
Institute of Artistic Ceramics and Glass

See also 
 Fachhochschule
 List of colleges and universities

References

External links 

University of Applied Sciences Koblenz 

Universities and colleges in Rhineland-Palatinate
University of Applied Sciences
Universities of Applied Sciences in Germany